Harry Lascelles Carr (8 October 1907 – 18 August 1943) was an English cricketer and journalist.  He was born in Lambeth, London, the son of News of the World editor Sir Emsley Carr and Jenny Lascelles Carr.  He was educated at Clifton College, before studying at Trinity Hall, Cambridge.

A right-handed batsman who fielded as a wicket-keeper, Carr made his first-class debut for HDG Leveson-Gower's XI against Oxford University in 1931.  He played a further match for Leveson-Gower's XI, against Cambridge University, with both matches coming at The Saffrons in 1931. While at Trinity Hall, Carr gained a Cambridge Blue in billiards and golf.  After graduating, he worked with his father at the News of the World. He later made his only appearance for Glamorgan in 1934 against Cambridge University.  In this match, he scored 6 runs before being stumped by Billy Griffith off the bowling of John Human.

He joined the Royal Air Force in World War II, being commissioned as a pilot officer on probation on 14 March 1941. Later being promoted to flight lieutenant, he worked within the intelligence branch of the RAF for two and a half years, before he was incapacitated by poor health.  He died in Marylebone, London on 18 August 1943, following an operation.

References

External links
Harry Carr at ESPNcricinfo
Harry Carr at CricketArchive

1907 births
1943 deaths
People from Lambeth
People educated at Clifton College
Alumni of Trinity College, Cambridge
English cricketers
Glamorgan cricketers
English male journalists
Military personnel from London
News of the World people
Royal Air Force officers
Royal Air Force personnel killed in World War II
H. D. G. Leveson Gower's XI cricketers
Royal Air Force Volunteer Reserve personnel of World War II
Wicket-keepers